The  of the Japan Academy Film Prize is one of the annual Awards given by the Japan Academy Film Prize Association.

List of winners

Multiple wins
The following individuals received two or more Best Actor awards:

External links
Japan Academy Film Prize official website 

Outstanding Performance by an Actor in a Leading Role
Film awards for lead actor